Arcade Perfect is Sonic Boom Six's second full-length CD, and their first on their own Rebel Alliance Recordings label. It was released in the UK, via their online store, on 12 November 2007 with a full nationwide release a week later.

Track listing
Arcade Perfect - 2:51
While You Were Sleeping - 3:35
Sound of a Revolution - 3:15
Tell Me Something That I Don’t Know - 3:40
The Strange Tale of Sid the Strangler - 2:58
Flower - 4:41
Meanwhile, Back in the Real World... - 2:56
September to May - 3:20
Ya Basta! [Rebel Alliance Mix] - 4:00
I Wish I Could Smile - 4:29
For 12 Weeks, the City is Theirs - 3:54

2011 UK CD version
We Wanna War [Demo]
Fear and Loathing in Whalley Range [Demo]
Meanwhile, Back in the Real World... [Demo]
Ya Basta! [Tim G Remix]

References

External links
Sonic Boom Six online store

Sonic Boom Six albums